Juansher was the Mihranid prince of Caucasian Albania, ruling the kingdom from 637 to 669. He was the son and successor of Varaz Grigor.

Throughout his reign, Juansher changed his allegiance thrice. He was at first subject to the Sasanian Empire between 637–651, then the Byzantine Empire between 653–665, and finally the Umayyad Caliphate between 665–669. He was assassinated during the Feast of the Cross and succeeded by his nephew Varaz-Tiridates I.

Juansher notably appears in what is considered to be the first long secular poem in Armenian literature, written by the 7th-century Armenian poet Davtak Kertogh.

Background 
Juansher belonged to the Parthian Mihranid dynasty, which claimed to be descended to Sasanian monarchs of Iran, who had held authority over Caucasian Albania since 252/3. It is uncertain how the Mihranids became Arranshahs (princes of Albania). Their ancestor, Mihran, was said to have received the region of Gardman by the Sasanian monarch Khosrow II. In , a Mihranid prince conquered all of Albania and assumed the title of Arranshah, but without embracing its royal status. The head of the family's full titulature was thus "Lord of Gardman and Prince of Albania". Out of four sons, Juansher was the second eldest of the Albanian prince Varaz Grigor. His name is derived from Persian Juwānshēr, meaning "young lion". He was most likely fluent in Middle Persian and Armenian, familiar with Albanian, and acquainted with some Greek and likely a small degree of Arabic.

Reign

Under the Sasanian Empire 

During the Arab-Islamic invasion of Iran, Juansher was summoned to lead the Albanian contingent. Along with contingents from Siwnik and Armenia, Juansher was part of the army of Rostam Farrokhzad, the spahbed (commander-in-chief) of the northern part of the empire. Juansher succeeded his father in 637. When Juansher reached Ctesiphon in 637 or 638, his position as sparapet (military commander) of the Albanians was formally acknowledged by the Sasanian monarch Yazdegerd III. Juansher suffered a serious wound at the Battle of al-Qadisiyyah, in which the Arabs triumphed. Along with some others, he managed to escape by swimming to the other side of the Euphrates River. When the Arabs later resumed their attacks and besieged Ctesiphon, Juansher led a force 3,000 soldiers on the right side of the Tigris River, being assigned to protect Yazdegerd III so he could move out of the city. The court, ministries, and the majority of the populace of the city likely went along with Yazdegerd III.

For several more years, Juansher fought under Farrukhzad, the brother and successor of Rostam. He participated in another crucial battle, which the 10th-century author Movses Kaghankatvatsi described as "a cruel defeat" for the Sasanians. In 644/45, Juansher went back to Albania through Adurbadagan, most likely due to losing faith in the Sasanian Empire, realizing its impending downfall. While he was still in Adurbadagan, Juansher alienated Farrukhzad by turning down a marriage alliance. After that, he rebelled against the Sasanians.

Although the wide Albanian fields and its capital, Partaw, were swiftly taken back by Sasanian forces, Juansher's guerrilla warfare proved to be extraordinarily effective, especially after he won the support of prominent figures in Iberia. Farrukhzad was thus forced to pursue a more accommodative course of action. With the help of Juansher's father-in-law, the prince of Siwnik, they came to an agreement that gave Juansher a sizable amount of autonomy. The quick military response Juansher gave to a later attempt to regain control demonstrated that the balance of power was still shifting. During this period (most likely during the end of the 640s), a larger amount of fragmentation was taking place as other spahbeds gained more control over their own territories. The Sasanian Empire was disintegrating into a network of local entities that would not necessarily form a united front against the Muslim invaders. In 651, Yazdegerd III was killed by a local miller, thus marking the end of the Sasanian Empire.

Under the Byzantine Empire 

Following the fall of the Sasanian Empire, the local rulers in the Southern Caucasus had choose whether cooperate with the new but possibly momentary caliphate, or the Byzantine Empire, which had survived the Muslim conquests. Juansher's father seemingly became the leader of Albania once more due to his seniority. He took the safe route by acknowledging the suzerainty of the caliph, but also instructed Juansher to get in contact with the Byzantine emperor and offer his services. Juansher sent a letter to the Byzantine emperor Constans II, in which he offered to become his vassal. The latter accepted his offer, bestowing Juansher with the high-ranking title of First Patrician. Juansher was also given the authority to assign a number of Roman titles to his subjects, and a piece of the True Cross. Juansher's submission to the Byzantines most likely took place before Constans II's campaign to Armenia in the autumn of 653, but was first really implemented during the civil war in the Islamic community between 656–661, when Constans II managed to exert his influence over all of the Southern Caucasus.

Movses depicts Juansher as a prominent local ruler during this period. When Juansher visited to see Constans II in person twice during his Southern Caucasian advance in 660–661, he received clear signs of favor on both occasions. He was officially anointed as king of "all the eastern peoples" at his second audience in the spring of 661, making him a client-ruler comparable to Hamazasp IV Mamikonian in Armenia. After the first civil war ended, it took some time before the caliphate established its authority once again north of the Zagros Mountains. Throughout this period, Juansher and the other Southern Caucasian rulers maintained their dominion as Roman subjects. Movses praises Juansher for launching a construction initiative and winning the admiration of the adjacent rulers. However, the Roman-supported peace in the area was short-lived.

The Khazars, who were expanding their dominance in the Kuban and Terek steppes, launched a series of raids into the Caucasus in 662. In 665, the Caucasus was attacked again, this time by the North Caucasian Huns, who were likely proxies of the Khazars. They planned their invasion to coincide with the winter solstice in order to ambush flocks and herds from Ayrarat and Siwnik on the winter pastures of the Araxes and Kura rivers. They gained much loot from the attack, which their king later returned after making peace with Juansher during a summit meeting.

Under the Umayyad Caliphate 

In the same year, Juansher submitted to the Umayyad caliph Mu'awiya I after being summoned by him. In 667/68, Juansher was amongst the figures summoned by Mu'awiya I to seek his counsel on how to assassinate Constans II, who was in Sicily at the time. Juansher reportedly played an important role in the decision (Constans II was later assassinated on 15 July 669), being in return rewarded with many presents and Siwnik added to his domain. He was also offered to receive Adurbadagan, but declined and instead received one third of the tribute collected from Albania by the caliphate. This marked the zenith of Juansher's rule. On 14 September 669, while celebrating the Feast of the Cross at Partaw, he was assassinated. The English historian James Howard-Johnston notes that this assassination, like that of Constans II, seemed to be "carefully planned." 

Juansher was succeeded by his nephew Varaz-Tiridates I.

Culture 
Although Christianity was the official religion of Albania and held significant political power, Zoroastrianism exerted a significant influence, particularly between the 6th and middle of the 7th-century. Despite being a Christian, Juansher continued to take part in the traditional Zoroastrian New Year's Feast of Nawasard with his personal bodyguards, and delight in the pagan performances of the gusank ("ministrels").

A chapter of Movses' book The History of the Caucasian Albanians includes a poem dedicated to Juansher by the 7th-century Armenian poet Davtak Kertogh, which is considered the first long secular poem in Armenian literature.

Family 
Juansher reportedly married three times. His second wife was a certain Xosrovanush, and his third was a daughter of the North Caucasian Hun king, whom he married in 665.

Notes

References

Sources 
 
 
 
 
 
 
 
 
 
 
 
 
 
 
 
 
 

669 deaths
Year of birth unknown
7th-century monarchs in Asia
7th-century Iranian people
Mihranids
Rebellions against the Sasanian Empire
Patricii
Vassal rulers of the Sasanian Empire
People of the Muslim conquest of Persia
Christians in the Sasanian Empire
Princes of Gardman